Fotbal Club Viitorul Constanța, commonly known as Viitorul Constanța or simply Viitorul, was a Romanian professional football club based in Ovidiu, Constanța County. They last played their home matches in blue and black kits at the Stadionul Viitorul, situated a few kilometres north of the city of Constanța.

Founded in 2009 by Gheorghe Hagi, the team was particularly known for promoting young talents from its academy, which earned them the nickname "Hagi's Kids". With the former Romanian international also acting as a coach, Viitorul Constanța had its first major success in the 2016–17 campaign, when it became the first side from the region of Dobruja to win the national title. Two years later, it also won the Romanian Cup and the Romanian Supercup. 

In June 2021, owner Gheorghe Hagi, chairman Gheorghe Popescu and Farul Constanța owner Ciprian Marica announced in a press conference that their two clubs have merged; Second division club Farul Constanța therefore took Viitorul's place in the first league from the 2021–22 Liga I season.

History

Founding and early years (2009–2012)

Viitorul Constanța was founded in the summer of 2009 and enrolled in the Liga III, the third tier of the Romanian football league system, after acquiring the playing rights of CSO Ovidiu. It has been owned since its creation by former Romanian international Gheorghe Hagi.

During the team's first season in Romanian football, they achieved promotion to the 2010–11 Liga II in round 33 after a fierce battle with ACS Berceni towards the end of the campaign. In the 2011–12 Liga II, Viitorul finished second in the standings and were promoted to the top-flight the following season.

Romanian titles, European participations and merger with Farul (2012–2021)
In the 2012–13 season, Viitorul made its first appearance in Liga I in the club's history. With 8 victories, 12 draws, and 13 defeats, it finished in 13th place with 36 points thereby avoiding relegation.  Viitorul had notable victories, but was ever-present in relegation battles for the following two campaigns.

In 2016, Viitorul finished in 5th place, earning a spot in the third qualifying round of the UEFA Europa League. Drawn against Belgian side Gent in their first European match, Viitorul was defeated 0–5 at the Ghelamco Arena.

On 13 May 2017, Viitorul managed to win the Liga I after a 1–0 home victory over CFR Cluj. It was the first major trophy in the club's history and ensured qualification for the UEFA Champions League. With an average age of 22.2 years, "Hagi's Kids" were the season's youngest league champion in Europe . In the third qualifying round of the Champions League, after a 1–0 win against APOEL at home, Viitorul once again suffered a harsh away defeat (0–4 a.e.t.).

On 21 June 2021, Gheorghe Hagi, owner and founder of Viitorul, Gheorghe Popescu, chairman of Viitorul, and Ciprian Marica, owner of Farul Constanța, announced in a press conference that their two clubs from Constanța County have merged. Farul took Viitorul's place in the Liga I, while Viitorul virtually disappeared in the process of the merger. With the Farul Stadium in an advanced state of degradation, the new entity moved to the Viitorul Stadium in Ovidiu.

Youth program

Viitorul Constanța was known for developing young players in Romania and having some of the best facilities in the country. The Academy was inherited by Farul Constanța following the 2021 merger.

Grounds

Viitorul returned to the newly-expanded Stadionul Viitorul in Ovidiu in the summer of 2015, on which it played until the club's disappearance in 2021.

Honours

Domestic

Leagues
Liga I
Winners (1): 2016–17
Liga II
Runners-up (1): 2011–12
Liga III
Winners (1): 2009–10

Cups
Cupa României
Winners (1): 2018–19
Supercupa României
Winners (1): 2019
Runners-up (1): 2017

Records and statistics

European Cups history

Notes
 1Q: First qualifying round
 2Q: Second qualifying round
 3Q: Third qualifying round
 PO: Play-off round

European cups all-time statistics

League history

References

External links

Official website
Club profile on UEFA's official website
Club profile on LPF's official website 

Football clubs in Constanța County
Sport in Constanța
Ovidiu
Association football clubs established in 2009
Association football clubs disestablished in 2021
Liga I clubs
Liga II clubs
Liga III clubs
2009 establishments in Romania
2021 disestablishments in Romania